Hyperolius ademetzi is a species of frog in the family Hyperoliidae.
It is endemic to Cameroon.
Its natural habitats are moist savanna, subtropical or tropical high-altitude shrubland, subtropical or tropical high-altitude grassland, rivers, freshwater lakes, freshwater marshes, and intermittent freshwater marshes.
It is threatened by habitat loss.

References

ademetzi
Endemic fauna of Cameroon
Amphibians described in 1931
Taxonomy articles created by Polbot
Fauna of the Cameroonian Highlands forests